Meyer Elkan Fürth was a German writer and teacher, who belonged to the school of the Me'assefim. He annotated a mathematical work by Abraham Joseph Menz that had appeared in Berlin in 1775, and wrote a number of Hebrew and German works.

Publications
 
 
  A commentary on the Sefer ibronot, with German translation.
  Moses Mendelssohn's Phädon, with a commentary in refutation of Mendelssohn's views.
  A polemic against the Reform movement.
 
 
  A polemic against Joseph Wolf and Gotthold Salomon's book Der Charakter des Judenthums, and against the latter's Selimas Stunden der Weihe, in Judæo-German.
  A portion of the preceding work in German.
  A commentary to Maimonides' Hilkhot kiddush ha-ḥodesh, together with Scriptural comments and novellæ.

References
 

19th-century German educators
19th-century German Jews
19th-century German male writers
Jewish German writers